Jack O'Connor (born 1 October 1998) is an Irish hurler who plays for Cork Senior Championship club Sarsfields and at inter-county level with the Cork senior hurling team. He usually lines out as a corner-forward.

Playing career

Sarsfields

O'Connor joined the Sarsfields club at a young age and played in all grades at juvenile and underage levels, winning a premier under-21 championship medal in 2017 following an eight-point defeat of Killeagh-St Ita's. By this stage, he had already made his senior hurling championship debut, coming on as a substitute in a 0-14 to 0-11 defeat of Carrigtwohill on 28 May 2016.

Cork

Minor and under-21

O'Connor first played for Cork at minor level in 2016, however, his sole season in the grade ended with a defeat by Tipperary in the Munster semi-final. On 13 July 2017, he made his first appearance for the Cork under-21 hurling team. On 4 July 2018, O'Connor won a Munster medal after scoring 1-02 from play in Cork's 2-23 to 1-13 defeat of Tipperary in the final. On 26 August 2018, he scored a point from play in Cork's 3-13 to 1-16 All-Ireland final defeat by Tipperary in what was his last game in the grade.

Senior

O'Connor made his senior debut for Cork on 27 January 2018, replacing Alan Cadogan for the final nine minutes of a National League game against Kilkenny at Páirc Uí Chaoimh. On 1 July 2018, he won his first Munster medal as an unused substitute following a 2-24 to 3-19 defeat of Clare in the final.

Career statistics

Club

Inter-county

Honours

Sarsfields
Cork Premier Under-21 A Hurling Championship (1): 2017

Cork
Munster Senior Hurling Championship (1): 2018
Munster Under-21 Hurling Championship (1): 2018

References

External links
2018 Cork Under-21 Hurling team player profiles  at the Cork GAA website

1998 births
Living people
Sarsfields (Cork) hurlers
Cork inter-county hurlers